The Anglican Church in Brazil is an evangelical Anglican denomination in Brazil. It is not a member of the Anglican Communion, but is in full communion with other provinces of the Global Fellowship of Confessing Anglicans and the Global South Fellowship of Anglican Churches.

History

The church had its origin in a 2005 split in which the Diocese of Recife, led by Robinson Cavalcanti, left the Anglican Episcopal Church of Brazil, because it had rejected the official Anglican stance on homosexuality, expressed at the Lambeth 1.10 Resolution in 1998.

The Diocese of Recife organized in the Anglican Church-Diocese of Recife and became associated to the Global South, as an extraprovincial diocese, and the Global Anglican Future Conference. At the same time they started church planting outside their territory, aiming to start a new conservative Anglican province in Brazil.

On 12 May 2018 the Anglican Church in Brazil was constituted as a province, with three dioceses, 54 communities, and Miguel Uchôa as the first Archbishop and Primate. It is not recognised as a member of the Anglican Communion, but has been described as the "41st province in the Anglican Communion" by the conservative grouping Global Anglican Future Conference (GAFCON).

Archbishop Peter Jensen argues that the division was "not over a matter of church politics or personal ambition" but was "a matter of the fundamentals of the faith, of what makes a true church, of the authority of God's word."

Dioceses
The church is organized in three dioceses and a missionary region.

Relations with other churches
The Anglican Church in Brazil has broken any ties with the liberal Anglican Episcopal Church of Brazil. It is in full communion with all the Global South (Anglican) and the Global Anglican Future Conference provinces, including those who aren't members of the Anglican Communion, like the Anglican Church in North America. The province is also a member of the Rede Inspire (Inspire Net), an association of around 400 churches in Brazil.

The Anglican Church in Brazil was represented at GAFCON III, held in Jerusalem, on 17–22 June 2018, by a 15-member delegation, including Primate Miguel Uchôa.

References

External links
 

Anglican denominations in South America
Anglicanism in Brazil
Christian organizations established in 2018
Anglican realignment denominations
Anglican denominations established in the 21st century